The discography of British singer-songwriter and musician Kate Nash consists of four studio albums, twenty-two singles and twenty-five music videos. Her debut album, Made of Bricks, charted at number one in the United Kingdom and achieved platinum status. The album garnered success across Europe and achieved gold status in Germany, as well as moderate success in the United States and Australia. It spawned four singles, UK number 2 "Foundations", "Mouthwash", "Pumpkin Soup" and "Merry Happy".

Nash released her riot grrrl- and doo-wop-inspired second studio album, My Best Friend Is You, in 2010. It charted at number eight in the UK and achieved success in both Europe and the United States, but not to the same extent as her previous album. The record spawned three singles and two promotional singles, including Nash's second-highest-charting song "Do Wah Doo" and "Kiss That Grrrl". Her third album, Girl Talk, was self-released in 2013. After a string of single releases and an EP, Agenda, released for Record Store Day, Nash preceded the release of her fourth studio album Yesterday Was Forever with the single "Drink About You".

Studio albums

Extended plays

Singles

Other charted songs

Featured songs
2008: "I Wish" (Ironik featuring Kate Nash)
2008: "Me and My Microphone" (Kano featuring Kate Nash)
2008: "Look What You Done" (Lethal Bizzle featuring Kate Nash)
2012: "AWWWKWAARRRDDD" (FIDLAR featuring Kate Na$h)
2013: "Hey, Asshole" (Watsky featuring Kate Nash)
2013: "Somebody Kill Me" (FIDLAR featuring Kate Na$h)
2016: "Rotten Teeth" (HOLYCHILD featuring Kate Nash)
2017: "I'll Be Fine" (D. Wing featuring Kate Nash)

Promotional singles

Music videos

Notes

References

Discographies of British artists
Pop music discographies